Cesare Pinarello (5 October 1932 – 2 August 2012) was an Italian cyclist who won two bronze medals at the Summer Olympics (1952 and 1956).

Biography
He died in Treviso on 2 August 2012 aged 79.

References

External links
 
 
 

1932 births
2012 deaths
Italian male cyclists
Cyclists at the 1952 Summer Olympics
Cyclists at the 1956 Summer Olympics
Olympic cyclists of Italy
Olympic bronze medalists for Italy
Sportspeople from Treviso
Olympic medalists in cycling
Medalists at the 1952 Summer Olympics
Medalists at the 1956 Summer Olympics
Cyclists from the Province of Treviso